Kailali District, a part of Sudurpashchim Province in Terai plain, is one of the 77 districts of Nepal.

Before the reunification of Nepal by Gorkha King Prithvi Narayan Shah, this district was the part of Doti Kingdom. Nepal lost it to the East India Company after the Anglo-Nepalese war (1814-1816) between the then Kingdom of Nepal and the East India Company followed by territorial concessions of Sugauli Treaty. Later on after the treaty of 1860, Nepal recovered this land along with Kanchanpur, Banke and Bardiya.

Geography and climate

Demographics
At the time of the 2011 Nepal census, Kailali District had a population of 775,709. Of these, 41.5% spoke Tharu, 27.3% Nepali, 18.7% Doteli, 6.3% Achhami, 1.4% Magar, 0.9% Maithili, 0.8% Hindi, 0.5% Bajureli, 0.4% Bajhangi, 0.3% Baitadeli, 0.3% Dailekhi, 0.2% Kham, 0.2% Raji, 0.2% Tamang, 0.2% Urdu, 0.1% Bhojpuri, 0.1% Darchuleli, 0.1% Gurung, 0.1% Jumli, 0.1% Newar and 0.1% other languages as their first language.

In terms of ethnicity/caste, 41.9% were Tharu, 20.8% Chhetri, 12.4% Hill Brahmin, 8.4% Kami, 3.9% Thakuri, 3.8% Magar, 2.2% Damai/Dholi, 1.1% other Dalit, 0.9% Sarki, 0.6% Musalman, 0.5% Lohar, 0.5% Sanyasi/Dasnami, 0.4% Badi, 0.4% Newar, 0.3% Raji, 0.3% Tamang, 0.2% Gurung, 0.2% other Terai, 0.1% Terai Brahmin, 0.1% Halwai, 0.1% Kathabaniyan, 0.1% Rai, 0.1% Yadav and 0.1% others.

In terms of religion, 94.9% were Hindu, 2.0% Buddhist, 1.9% Christian, 0.6% Muslim, 0.2% Prakriti and 0.3% others.

In terms of literacy, 65.9% could read and write, 2.7% could only read and 31.4% could neither read nor write.

Administration
The district consists of 13 Local Levels, of which one is a sub-metropolitan city, six are urban municipalities and six are rural municipalities. These are as follows:
 Dhangadhi Sub-Metropolitan City
 Lamki Chuha Municipality
 Tikapur Municipality
 Ghodaghodi Municipality
 Bhajani Municipality
 Godawari Municipality
 Gauriganga Municipality
 Janaki Rural Municipality
 Bardagoriya Rural Municipality
 Mohanyal Rural Municipality
 Kailari Rural Municipality
 Joshipur Rural Municipality
 Chure Rural Municipality

See also
 Sainik Awasiya Mahavidyalaya Teghari Kailali
 Sudurpashchim Province

References

External links

 

 
Districts of Nepal established during Rana regime or before